The following highways are numbered 458:

Canada
Manitoba Provincial Road 458

Japan
 Japan National Route 458

United States
  Indiana State Road 458
  Maryland Route 458
  New York State Route 458
  Pennsylvania Route 458 (former)
  Puerto Rico Highway 458
  Farm to Market Road 458